George Lyons (born April 1884) was an English footballer. His regular position was as a forward. He was born in Salford, Lancashire. He played for Black Lane Temperance, Oldham Athletic, and Manchester United.

External links
MUFCInfo.com profile

1884 births
English footballers
Manchester United F.C. players
Oldham Athletic A.F.C. players
Footballers from Salford
Year of death missing
Association football forwards